The 1984 Derby City Council election took place on 3 May 1984 to elect members of Derby City Council in England. This was on the same day as other local elections. 15 of the council's 44 seats were up for election. The Labour Party retained control of the council.

Overall results

|-
| colspan=2 style="text-align: right; margin-right: 1em" | Total
| style="text-align: right;" | 14
| colspan=5 |
| style="text-align: right;" | 43,337
| style="text-align: right;" |

Ward results

Abbey

Allestree

Alvaston

Babington

Blagreaves

Boulton

Breadsall

Chaddesden

Chellaston

Darley

Derwent

Kingsway

Litchurch

Spondon

References

1984 English local elections
May 1984 events
1984
1980s in Derbyshire